Percy Cheffers (1 June 1913 – 18 October 1965) was an Australian rules footballer who played with St Kilda in the Victorian Football League (VFL). Before joining St Kilda, Cheffers played with Melbourne's reserves side, winning a VFL seconds premiership in 1935.

During World War II, Cheffers started as a private in the Royal Australian Electrical and Mechanical Engineers (RAEME) in 1940 for the Australian Sixth Division, in the 2/2nd Field Workshops, RAEME. He rose to the rank of warrant officer class I in charge of around 18 people who repaired radios for the Australian Ninth Division. He saw action in Libya, Palestine, New Guinea and Borneo.

Percy married Mary Ellen Braines in the 1930s and had four children with her.  He married his second wife, Audrey, in the 1950s.  He died
in a house fire in Fitzroy in 1965.

His son, John Cheffers, became a noted sports academician.

Notes

External links 

Demonwiki profile

1913 births
1965 deaths
Australian rules footballers from Victoria (Australia)
St Kilda Football Club players
Australian Army personnel of World War II
Australian Army soldiers
Deaths from fire
Accidental deaths in Victoria (Australia)